Anthony James Fitzpatrick FREng HonFRIBA (1951-26 July 2003) was an eminent structural engineer and director of Arup.

Life and career

He graduated from Leeds University  in 1972 with a first class degree in civil engineering, having won the Holst Prize. He worked for Arup in the UK and in Iran, before joining the design team for the new British Library at St Pancras Station in 1978.

In 1982 he relocated to Hong Kong where he worked on the Hong Kong Bank headquarters, the Shanghai Hilton and Century Tower in Tokyo.

In 1987, when he returned to London, he was made a director of Arup. He later became a board member of the global Partnership and chairman of the Building Engineering Board.

In 2001 he became chairman of Arup’s Americas Division.

While in London, he worked on the designs for the new Tate Modern and 30 St Mary Axe in London as well as the *Shard of Glass, London Bridge, London

Fitzpatrick took over the Millennium Bridge design following its opening when it was found that it wobbled. He designed the measures to correct the wobble, including tuned mass dampers and viscous dampers.

In 2003, while working on the design for Heathrow's Terminal 5, Tony Fitzpatrick was killed in a road accident when his bicycle flipped, throwing him under a passing truck.

Unfinished projects

A number of Tony Fitzpatrick's design have not yet been built. They include:

Tour Sans Fin, Paris

References

British structural engineers
1951 births
2003 deaths
Fellows of the Royal Academy of Engineering
Fellows of the Royal Institute of British Architects